Mercedes may refer to:

People
 Mercedes (name), a Spanish feminine name, including a list of people and fictional characters with the given name or last name

Automobile-related
 Mercedes (marque), the pre-1926 brand name of German automobile models and engines built by Daimler Motors company
 Mercedes-Benz, the post-1926 German brand of automobiles, engines, and trucks now owned by the Mercedes-Benz Group
 Mercedes-AMG, a subsidiary of Daimler AG that builds customized and high performance Mercedes-branded automobiles
 Mercedes-Benz in Formula One, the Mercedes Formula One racing team, currently known as Mercedes-AMG Petronas Motorsport
 Mercedes-Benz in motorsport, its activities in sportscar racing, rallying, Formula Three, DTM, V8 Supercars Australia and Formula One
 American Mercedes (1904 automobile), a company licensed to build Mercedes automobiles in America

Places
 Mercedes, Buenos Aires Province, Argentina
 Mercedes Partido, Argentina
 Mercedes, Corrientes, Argentina
 Mercedes Department, Argentina
 Mercedes, Costa Rica
 Mercedes, Camarines Norte, Philippines
 Mercedes, Eastern Samar, Philippines

 Mercedes, Texas, United States
 Mercedes, Uruguay
 Mercedes Formation (disambiguation), geological formations in South America
 Villa Mercedes, San Luis province, Argentina

Ships
 Nuestra Señora de las Mercedes, a Spanish frigate sunk in 1804 off the coast of Portugal and thought to be discovered by the Odyssey Marine Exploration 
 Spanish cruiser Reina Mercedes, an Alfonso XII-class unprotected cruiser of the Spanish Navy, scuttled in 1898 and later salvaged by the United States Navy
 MV Mercedes I, a freighter shipwrecked off Florida in 1984
 USS Mercedes (YT-108), scuttled on 2 January 1942.
 BAP Mercedes, a Peruvian Navy frigate in service from the 1840s to the 1850s
 RFA Mercedes, a collier which served with the Royal Fleet Auxiliary, see List of replenishment ships of the Royal Fleet Auxiliary

Other uses
 Mercedes (1933 film), a lost film, the first Spanish "talkie" film, directed by José María Castellví
 Mercedes (1993 film), an Egyptian-Swiss film directed by Yousry Nasrallah
 Mercedes, a 1998 Iranian film directed by Masoud Kimiai
 Mercedes, a proposed gossamer-winged butterfly genus nowadays again included in Calycopis
 "Mercedes", a song by Joseph Arthur from the 1997 album Big City Secrets
 "Mercedes", a song by Deadmau5 from the 2014 album While(1<2)
 "Mercedes", a 2021 song by Brent Faiyaz
 Mercedes College (Adelaide), South Australia
 Mercedes College, Perth, Western Australia

See also 
 Mr. Mercedes, a 2014 detective novel by Stephen King
 Mercedes-Euklid, an early 20th-century computing device
 Mercedita (disambiguation)
 Merced (disambiguation)